Deroceras bakurianum is a species of air-breathing land slug, a terrestrial pulmonate gastropod mollusk in the family Agriolimacidae.

Its specific name is after its type locality, which is in Bakuriani.

Distribution 
The species occurs in the Caucasus: Georgia and other areas.

The type locality is Bakuriani in the Borjomi district, in Georgia.

Ecology 
This species lives in forests.

References

Agriolimacidae
Gastropods described in 1912